Rock Gone Wild was to be a four-day rock festival, focusing on hard rock, heavy metal and glam rock from four different decades. The inaugural event was scheduled to take place August 20–23, 2009, in Algona, Iowa. The festival was originally slated to take place at the Freedom Park festival ground, and was moved to the Diamond Jo Casino festival grounds before it was eventually cancelled altogether.

Many of the fans who prepurchased tickets lost their money, and some say that the entire event was a fake from the very beginning.

The bill, was to have featured more than 50 bands over four days on two stages, as listed below.

2009 lineup that never happened

Thursday, August 20 
Saxon
Jackyl
Warrant
April Wine
Honeymoon Suite
Black 'N Blue
Tigertailz
Ernie and the Automatics
Sick of Sarah
Savior

Friday, August 21 
Puddle of Mudd
Saliva
Saigon Kick
Cherie Currie
Powerman 5000
Tyketto
Marcy Playground
Rhino Bucket
Crazy Lixx
Throw the Fight
Signum A.D.
Attention
Ashamed
Nero Zero
Iowa Battle of the Bands winner

Saturday, August 22 
Twisted Sister
Skid Row
Lita Ford
Dokken
Great White
Kix
L.A. Guns
Hardcore Superstar
Primal Fear
Dangerous Toys
Helix
Junkyard
Sex Department
Frankenstein 3000
Stallion Four
Mighty Swine

Sunday, August 23 
George Thorogood and the Destroyers
Candlebox
Sevendust
Saving Abel
Eve 6
Tantric
Armored Saint
Lizzy Borden
Lillian Axe
Tuff
Texas Hippie Coalition
Downtread
Stuck on Stupid
Archer
Fresh Hot Lint

References

Rock festivals in the United States